New Worlds: An Anthology is an anthology edited by Michael Moorcock published in 1983.

Plot summary
New Worlds: An Anthology is a collection of 30 stories, poems and articles from New Worlds magazine.

Reception
Dave Langford reviewed New Worlds: An Anthology for White Dwarf #47, and stated that "it's an immensely valuable book for fans, no less than 131 pages being devoted to a complete index of all 216 issues of NW".

Dave Pringle reviewed New Worlds: An Anthology for Imagine magazine, and commented that "the highlights include Barry Bayley's brilliant pastiche of William Burroughs, 'The Four-Colour Problem' (surely the best thing Bayley ever wrote?) and Pamela Zoline's oddly moving 'The Heat Death of the Universe', a Pop Art painting come to life".

Reviews
Review by David Pringle (1984) in Interzone, #7 Spring 1984 
Review by Nick Pratt (1984) in Foundation, #31 July 1984 
Review by Norman Spinrad (1984) in Isaac Asimov's Science Fiction Magazine, August 1984 
Review by Michael A. Morrison (1984) in Fantasy Review, August 1984 
Review by Norman Spinrad (2005) in Asimov's Science Fiction, October-November 2005

References

1983 novels